Ontario-Montclair School District is a K-8 school district in San Bernardino County, California that covers all of Montclair and a large portion of Ontario. It was established in 1884 and currently serves approximately 24,000 students. The district feeds into Chaffey Joint Union High School District.

Schools

Elementary schools
Arroyo Elementary School
Berlyn Elementary School
Bon View Elementary School
Buena Vista Elementary School
Central Language Academy
Corona Elementary School
Del Norte Elementary School
Edison Elementary School
El Camino Elementary School
Elderberry Elementary School
Euclid Elementary School
Hawthorne Elementary School
Haynes Elementary School
Howard Elementary School
Kingsley Elementary School
Lehigh Elementary School
Lincoln Elementary School
Linda Vista Elementary School
Mariposa Elementary School
Mission Elementary School
Montera Elementary School
Monte Vista Elementary School
Ramona Elementary School
Sultana Elementary School
Vineyard Elementary School
Vista Grande Elementary School

Middle schools
De Anza Middle School
Oaks Middle School
Serrano Middle School
Vernon Middle School
Vina Danks Middle School
Wiltsey Middle School

References

External links
 

School districts in San Bernardino County, California
School districts established in 1884
1884 establishments in California